FC Spartak-Chukotka Moscow was a Russian football team from Moscow. It played professionally in 1999 and 2000 (in 2000 it was playing on the second-highest level in the Russian First Division).

External links
  Team history at KLISF (Archived on 2016-03-03).

Association football clubs established in 1998
Association football clubs disestablished in 2000
Defunct football clubs in Moscow
1998 establishments in Russia
2000 disestablishments in Russia